Le Puid is a commune in the Vosges department in Grand Est in northeastern France.

Inhabitants are called Piedestains.

History
Until 1793 Le Puid was part of the Principality of Salm-Salm.

See also
Communes of the Vosges department

References

Communes of Vosges (department)
Salm-Salm